David Preston (born circa 1947) is an author in the Seattle area. His published works include Motorcycle 101 and Motorcycle 201 on motorcycle rider safety, and the novels Mourning Ride and The Third Marcia. The Seattle Times called Motorcycle 101 a "good introduction" for new riders.

Preston has been a contributor to Sound Rider! since 2000 and American Road magazine since the early 2000s.

In addition to being an author, Preston has worked as a high school English teacher, radio announcer, and public relations person at two Seattle area motorcycle dealers.

Bibliography

References

External links 
 

Living people
American instructional writers
Motorcycling writers
Motorcycle training
Writers from Kirkland, Washington
1947 births